Phoenix Hong Kong Channel is one of the six channels that Phoenix Television operates. It was launched on 28 March 2011 in order to serve Chinese viewers in Hong Kong, and it is Phoenix Television's first Yue Chinese-language channel that is available across Hong Kong. This channel now broadcasts through cable television and satellite television systems. Some of its programmes still broadcasting in Mandarin Chinese. 97% of the company is owned by a single holder in Beijing Named Vivian Huo, managing director at H&H Capital Partners.

Programmes

Homemade
Info Stream
Phoenix Afternoon News
Phoenix News On 6
Medi App
Speak Out Hong Kong
News Decoder

Related channels
Phoenix Chinese Channel
Phoenix InfoNews Channel
Phoenix Chinese News and Entertainment Channel
Phoenix Movies Channel

References

External links 
Official Site 

Television networks in China
Cable television in Hong Kong
Television channels and stations established in 2011